Statistics of UAE Football League in season 1978/79.

Overview
Al-Nasr Sports Club won the championship.

References
United Arab Emirates - List of final tables (RSSSF)

UAE Pro League seasons
1
Emir